Trasimene  may refer to:

Lake Trasimeno, in Italy
Trasimène, a 1809-1814 département in the First French Empire
Battle of Lake Trasimene, a major battle in the Second Punic War
Trasimene Line, a German defensive line in Italy during World War II